'Bani Awadh is a sub-district located in Ba'dan District, Ibb Governorate, Yemen. Bani Awadh had a population of 6944 as of 2004.

References 

Sub-districts in Ba'dan District